The 2004 Paris–Tours was the 98th edition of the Paris–Tours cycle race and was held on 10 October 2004. The race started in Saint-Arnoult-en-Yvelines and finished in Tours. The race was won by Erik Dekker of the Rabobank team.

General classification

References

2004 in French sport
2004
2004 UCI Road World Cup
October 2004 sports events in France
2004 in road cycling